This is a list of mosques in Lebanon.

See also
 Lists of mosques
 List of mosques in Beirut
 Islam in Lebanon

External links

 
Lebanon
Mosques